Wild Kratts is an educational children's live-action/flash-animated series created by Chris and Martin Kratt. The Kratt Brothers Company and 9 Story Media Group produce the show, which is presented by PBS in the United States and by TVOKids in Canada. The show's aim is to educate children about biology, zoology, and ecology, and teach kids small ways to make big impacts. It has ties to the Kratts' previous shows, Kratts' Creatures and Zoboomafoo, and contains numerous characters from the latter. In the show, the animated Kratts encounter wild animals during stories of adventure and mystery. This program is the longest lasting series created by the Kratt Brothers, lasting up to over a decade compared to the respective 3-month and 2-year run of the last two series.

Series overview

Episodes

Season 1 (2011–12)

Season 2 (2012–14) 
This is the first season to begin with a view of the Earth before the Kratt Brothers were shown introducing the audience.

Season 3 (2014–15) 
This is the second season to begin with a view of the Earth before the Kratt Brothers were shown introducing the audience.

Season 4 (2015–17)

Season 5 (2017–19)

Season 6 (2019–2021)

Season 7

References

Notes

External links 
 PBS episode descriptions
 PBS Parents: Wild Kratts
 KET - Wild Kratts - List All Episodes
Wild Kratts TV Show - Season 6 Episodes List - Next Episode

Lists of American children's animated television series episodes
Lists of Canadian children's animated television series episodes